Indira Nagar is a railway station on the Chennai MRTS. Located opposite the Institute of Chemical Technology on Rajiv Gandhi Salai (OMR), it exclusively serves the Chennai MRTS. The station can also be accessed through canal bank road, Indira Nagar.

History
Indira Nagar station was opened on 26 January 2004, as part of the second phase of the Chennai MRTS network.

Structure
The elevated station is built on the western banks of Buckingham Canal. The length of the platform is 280 m. The station building consists of 1,350 sq m of parking area in its basement.

Service and connections
Indira Nagar station is the thirteenth station on the MRTS line to Velachery. In the return direction from Velachery, it is currently the fifth station towards Chennai Beach station

See also
 Chennai MRTS
 Chennai suburban railway
 Chennai Metro
 Transport in Chennai

References

Chennai Mass Rapid Transit System stations
Railway stations in Chennai
Railway stations opened in 2004